Völkl Ski International, GmbH, is a sports equipment manufacturing company based in Bavaria, Germany. Initially it manufactured skis, but has extended its line to snowboards, outerwear, and tennis gear. Völkl's United States subsidiary is located in Lebanon, New Hampshire along with its wholly owned binding manufacturer, Marker. In 2015 Völkl bought the ski boot manufacturer Dalbello.

Völkl skis 

Since 1914, Völkl has manufactured skis in Straubing, Germany, a Bavarian town about one and a half hour's drive northeast of Munich. In the 1960s, Sears started distributing Völkl in North America under the Othmar Schneider and Sears brands. Though they recently built a state-of-the-art production facility in Straubing, the original factory is still in use as the Völkl World Logistics Center.

Völkl Racing Ski Team 
 Jens Byggmark
 Andrea Fischbacher
 Manfred Pranger
 Stefano Gross
 Laurenne Ross
 Nolan Kasper

Völkl Freeski Team 

Ingrid Backstrom
 Russ Henshaw
 Ahmet Dadali
 Andrea Binning
 Ane Enderud
 Caja Schöpf
 Emilia Wint
 Emma Dalhstrom
 Grete Eliassen
 Janina Kuzma
 Jen Hudak
 Jeremy Pancras
 Markus Eder
 Nick Goepper
 Nico Zacek
 Paddy Graham
 Oscar Scherlin
 Pekka Hyysalo
 Sam Smoothy
 Stian Hagen
 Virginie Faivre
 Thomas Dolpads
 Matt Phillipi
 Ted Davenport
 Thomas Hlawitschka
 Walter Wood
 Matt Reardon
 Per Jonsson
 Warren Smith
 Ian Mac Intosh
 Flo Wieser
 Tanner Rainville
 Dash Longe
 Ian McIntosh
 Matt Philippe
 Lyman Currier
 Maddie Bowman
 Sierra Quitiquit
 Jess McMillan
Alex Beaulieu-Marchand
Øystein Bråten
 Andri Ragettli

Völkl in professional tennis
Völkl tennis rackets were used by players such as Boris Becker, Michael Stich, Sergi Bruguera, Petr Korda and Jana Novotna. The list of current players includes Stefanie Vögele, Liezel Huber, Laura Siegemund and many Senior and Junior players on tour.  Volkl Tennis is no longer a part of Volkl Skis and the manufacturing takes place in an entirely different factory.

Tennis racket models 

Tour 10 V-Engine
Quantum 10
Quantum 10 Tour
DNX 1
DNX 2
DNX 3
DNX 4
DNX 7
DNX 8
DNX 10
C10 Pro
Organix
Team Speed
PB 10 Mid

Marker Volkl, USA
Located in New Hampshire, Marker Volkl, USA is the importer and distributor of Völkl products in the United States, and a subsidiary of Völkl International. Jarden Action Sports owns both Marker Volkl, USA and Völkl International. K2 and LINE were acquired by the Jarden Corporation in 2007. Jarden was acquired by Newell in 2016. Newell sold Völkl and K2 to Kohlberg & Company in 2017.

References

External links

Official website

Tennis equipment manufacturers
Sporting goods manufacturers of Germany
German brands
Companies based in Bavaria
Ski equipment manufacturers
Manufacturing companies established in 1923
1923 establishments in Germany
2007 mergers and acquisitions
2016 mergers and acquisitions
2017 mergers and acquisitions